Samata is an India-based non-governmental organization that focuses on advocacy and development issues among tribal communities in Andhra Pradesh. Samata helps tribal groups address problems of land alienation, displacement, and political dis-empowerment. Its mission is to uphold the traditional, constitutional, and human rights of the tribal or adivasi people.

Samata focuses primarily on projects in the tribal villages of East Godavari and Vizag districts in the state of Andhra Pradesh, India. This region forms a part of the Eastern Ghats range of mountains.

History of Samata
Samata achieved NGO status in 1990 and has become one of the primary advocates for tribal and adivasi rights in India. It continually expanded as an organization, taking on new campaigns and issues as the demand for its services grew in the 1990s and into the new millennium.

Beginning
In 1987 Samata was formed to mobilize groups of tribal and rural youth against exploitation by non-tribal people and address the government's negligence towards villages of Mallapuram, East Godavari District of Andhra Pradesh. Samata applied tribal land protection laws to prevent further abuse of tribal land rights, and they eventually won the implementation of government programs in 49 villages of the area that led to the construction of primary schools, housing, roads, drinking water projects, and electricity grids.

Samata was formally registered as a non-government organization in August 1990 under the Indian Societies Registration Act. The day after their official formation,

Growth
New projects and campaigns followed the early actions in Mallapuram. Samata organized communities in the hills of Poolabanda, Andhra Pradesh and facilitated an ongoing dialogue with government officials covering primary education, development projects, and environmental rights. In Sovva, Orissa Samata helped farmers form the Vegetable Growers’ Cooperative and successfully lobby the Integrated Tribal Development Agency (ITDA) for assistance with the transportation of their goods to the market.

Samatha judgment
During an organizing session on tribal land alienation in January 1993, villagers informed Samata of mining companies acquiring tribal land specifically protected by the Fifth Schedule of the Indian Constitution referring to Scheduled Tribes. Samata mobilized a grassroots movement among villagers in the affected areas and began a legal battle that same year.

They filed a case in the local court and again in the High Court against the Government of A.P for leasing tribal lands to private mining companies in the scheduled areas. The High Court dismissed the case after which Samata filed a special leave petition in the Supreme Court of India. In July 1997 by a three judge-bench. In its final verdict the Supreme Court of India declared that the term ‘person’ would include both natural persons as well as juristic persons, including constitutional governments, and that all lands leased by the government or its agencies to private mining companies in the scheduled areas were null and void.

It also held that transfer of land to the government or its instrumentalities is an
entrustment of public property. Since public corporations function in public interest, such transfers were upheld.

Community development focus
For the last ten years Samata has focused on community-based development with the following objectives:
 Assist tribal people in obtaining basic development and infrastructure facilities for education, health care, drinking water, and housing.
 Encourage sustainable development with regard to forests and other natural resources.
 Raise consciousness of legal rights among tribal groups.
 Organize tribal communities to resist exploitation, assert their rights and control their natural resources.
 Promote accountable, grassroots-level institutions for socio-economic independence and self-governance.

Problems and issues
 Land alienation, exploitation by non-tribal groups, industrialization and displacement, state violation of constitutional and protective legislation 
 Loss of control over natural resources and rights to decision-making  
 Economic exploitation and abuse by moneylenders and traders 
 Deforestation and indiscriminate plunder of natural resources through ill-conceived development policies of the state 
 Government negligence and lack of infrastructure facilities to the tribal groups whose basic needs are scarcely addressed; 
 Ill-health and inaccessibility of health services resulting in high mortality; 
 Inadequate and substandard educational facilities to the tribal children with a very high drop out rate at the school level particularly, of girl children.
 we are testing 26/02/2022 - 4.19pm

Activities of Samata during the period
Within a larger development context, Samata explored ways of creating holistic approaches to supporting tribal groups struggling for land rights, environmental protection, and a responsive democracy. Samata's action took the form of grassroots campaigns to address the problems and issues facing tribal groups. These campaigns included:
 Building up micro credit networks among tribal women.
 Encouraging alternative development systems and local democratic institutions to avoid future economic exploitations and deprivations. This led to the creation of business associations and cooperatives, grain banks, property protection groups, health centers, and water-user associations.
 Constructing community managed primary education centers to meet the growing demand for education among tribal groups at the village level.
 Resolving forest conflicts, attaining recognition of forest settlements, and forming Vana Samrakshana Samithis (forest protection committees under the World Bank-aided forestry project).
 Using alternative technology development systems. These systems combine the traditional knowledge of tribal groups with low-cost modern technologies for safe drinking water, environmentally friendly irrigation, electricity, housing and land development projects.
 Promoting eco-tourism.
 Setting a precedent for conflict resolution between tribals and the state by settling conflicts over the designation of forest village by the Ministry of Environment and Forests, according to the guidelines set in 1980.
 Setting up a micro-hydel project as a model in an interior tribal area as alternate source of energy generation in the hills.

The Metamorphis – 1998

Samata, having played the role of a community-based micro level development organisation with its focus on organising tribal communities shifted its focus to advocacy and to providing support to address the macro issues of the region of north coastal Andhra Pradesh and Southern Orissa. 
Under the changed perspective, Samata's new focus is:   
To work towards a people and environment friendly development of the Eastern Ghats region. 
To enable community-based organisations working with the marginalised like tribals, farmers, fishermen, etc. build up their capacities with the support and experience of  Samata. 
To endeavour towards development of alternate development designs for optimal utilisation of natural resources. 
To empower poor communities in the Eastern Ghats and help them in their right to decision-making and right to gain control over their natural resources. 
To build up a strong Resource Centre for research and documentation on the issues related to north coastal Andhra Pradesh, particularly the tribal areas.

Services provided by Samata

1. Capacity building :

Samata, with its vast experience in community organisation, provides capacity building support to small groups and local organisations working for people's rights as they find it difficult to obtain information and inputs on their own. Samata assists ten community-based organizations in north coastal Andhra Pradesh in capacity building, education and health, legal aid, linkages, information and documentation, organisation management, financial support, campaign support, marketing and technical expertise.

2. Mines, Minerals & People:

Samata is the National Secretariat for a national network of communities, NGO's, resource organisations and several concerned institutions and individuals called Mines, Minerals & PEOPLE (mm&P). This network addresses the problems of communities and mine-workers affected by mining and also its impacts on the environment. It has about 150 member groups from 16 states in the country. The network support local campaigns through information, linkages, legal, media, technical and policy support on mining issues and highlights them at a national and international level.

3. Industry Watch:

Samata, being an advocacy and support group, monitors the proposed and existing industries and development projects in the state of A.P in order to act as a vigilant civil society. It participates in public hearings, accesses information and disseminates it to the local communities affected. It takes up legal, technical and media advocacy on urban and rural environment issues affected by industries.

4. Support to Development Activities:

Samata implements development programmes in the tribal villages through local community participation to meet their basic requirements of housing, drinking water, education, health services, etc. by linking up with either government departments like Tribal Welfare, Panchayat Raj and Rural Development, Forest Department, etc. or with institutions/organizations concerned with the development of tribals. Samata also encourages communities to build up local sustainable institutions for over-coming exploitation through women's thrift societies, forest protection committees, health and education committees and farmers’ associations.

5. Direct legal services:

Legal aid which is most crucial for marginalised communities fighting for their rights is inaccessible to them. Inability to understand the laws or approach the judiciary on their own makes local communities and small organisations working with them vulnerable to exploitation by the state and other forces. Samata provides direct legal services to communities and groups by helping in legal problems like false criminal cases, illegal custodies, getting bails, harassment and human rights violations, land alienation, either through writ petitions or public interest litigations. It takes up legal action and advocacy on issues related to tribal, forest, environment, industrial violations of the Constitution.
   
6. Campaign support and legal advocacy:

Samata provides assistance to local struggles of tribals, farmers, fishermen, etc. who are fighting in the region for their specific rights of land, water, resources and struggles against displacement by industries. Local groups in Orissa and North Coastal Andhra Pradesh have asked Samata for guidance in organising committees, dissemination of information, planning and implementing campaign strategies, cultural training, help in legal advocacy through public interest litigations and writs, spreading legal awareness and literature among communities, etc.

7. Information support:

Communities affected by private or government projects have a right to information on these projects and their likely impacts. Information should also be accessible to local groups and communities on legal rights, laws and regulations, and other programmes relevant to them. As there is an information-vacuum due to reluctance from government and industries in sharing it, Samata collects information, compiles into brief informative documents and disseminates it. Demystifying legal and technical information, particularly in the context of development projects and spreading this literature in the vernacular is another important activity of Samata.
 
8. Media advocacy:

Media being the most powerful instrument of publishing information, gathering information, creating public awareness and acting as a pressure on the government to follow transparency and objectivity in its policies and programmes, Samata has been using media advocacy in all its campaign for the protection of peoples rights. Samata would concentrate on developing media advocacy for the issues of the Eastern Ghats and to give strength to local struggles. 
 
9. Linkages: 
 
Small local groups need to come out of their isolated struggles as issues affecting people are based on micro-level policies of the state. Samata, with its experience and access to other people's networks helps local struggles by providing linkages to larger movements and fora so as to build up a strong lobby support for the issues in the region.

10. Technical expertise and alternatives:

Samata supports small organisations and communities with technical expertise in seeking alternative sustainable development designs which can be managed by the communities. This includes harnessing locally available natural resources for meeting basic needs of drinking water, electricity, irrigation, housing, etc. appropriate to the area. With the help of the technical experts Samata also takes up impact assessment studies and gives constructive alternatives which are ecologically and socially enduring and press for balanced development policies of the government.

11. Research and Documentation:

Samata takes up research, studies and prepares reports on issues related to tribals/scheduled areas, mining, forestry, environment, human rights, land alienation, rural development programmes, legal issues, etc. Some of the studies undertaken Samata have been on the impact of the Joint Forest Management program in A.P, the impact of Water Users’ Associations, feasibility studies for micro-hydel projects, socio-economic status of mining affected tribals in Anantagiri mandal of A.P, etc.

See also
 Samata Party

References

External links
SAMATA – A PROFILE
Visit Samata India

http://www.dhimsa.net
  
ORGANISATION DETAILS:

Registered under Societies Registration Act XXI of 1860.

Non-profit organisations based in India
Visakhapatnam